Maria-Elena Laas is an American actress of Puerto Rican descent.

Early life
Maria-Elena Laas was born in Ponce, Puerto Rico and raised in Saudi Arabia and Japan.

Career
Laas started her modeling career at the age of 13. She has appeared in over 90 international commercials and advertising campaigns, including Garnier, Mango, Miller Lite, Carlsberg, Coors Lite, Budweiser, Ford, and Target. In 2006, she appeared in an advertising campaign for coffee brand Nespresso, opposite actor George Clooney.

Her first on-screen appearance was a role as Marisa Rios in the episode "Silicone Valley of the Dolls" of the crime drama television series Pacific Blue. In 2002, she portrayed Svetlana in sitcom Grounded for Life. Laas' film credits include the comedy film The Hot Chick (2002) and independent films Suffering Man's Charity (2007), Airplane Disasters (2007), Lunatics, Lovers and Poets (2009) and Kill the Habit (2010). In 2018, Laas landed the role of Cruz in the drama television series Vida. The series centers around the Mexican American community in Los Angeles.

In 2020, she had a main role as Rosalita Vega on Cinemax's action television series Warrior. In the second season of Warrior, Rosalita Vega appeared in five episodes.

Personal life 
She currently resides in Southern California.

Filmography

References

External links 

Living people
American film actresses
American television actresses
Puerto Rican female models
American people of Puerto Rican descent
Actresses from Ponce, Puerto Rico
Year of birth missing (living people)